The Magnus Cup is the trophy presented to the winner of the Ligue Magnus (Magnus League) playoffs, and is named after Louis Magnus, first president of the International Ice Hockey Federation.

References

Ligue Magnus
Ice hockey trophies and awards